Ordell Wayne Braase (March 13, 1932 – March 25, 2019) was an American football defensive end in the National Football League (NFL). He played with the Baltimore Colts throughout his career.  While Braase was with the Colts they won the NFL Championship three times, in 1958, 1959 and 1968. He was a Pro Bowl pick in both 1966 and 1967. In his final season (1968), the Colts went to Super Bowl III, on January 12, 1969, only to lose to the New York Jets.

Career 

After playing at South Dakota, the Colts drafted Braase in the 14th round of the 1954 NFL draft.  However, he did not join the team until 1957, delayed by three years of service in the U. S. Army which included a tour of duty in Korea.  In his second season, he was a won an NFL title in the 1958 NFL Championship Game, a game widely considered one of the best in NFL history.

During his football career in Baltimore, Braase performed in commercials for Dixie Cola, even singing their jingle.

Following his retirement as an active player, Braase was a restaurant owner in Timonium, Maryland, and in the 1970s was an executive with a Baltimore truck body manufacturer. He also teamed with play-by-play announcer Chuck Thompson to provide color commentary for radio broadcasts of Colts games. In the 1990s, he co-hosted a popular program, Braase, Donovan, Davis and Fans on WJZ-TV in Baltimore with fellow Colt teammate Art Donovan.  The trio talked more about Art Donovan's fabled stories than contemporary NFL football, but the show held high ratings in its time period.

Braase later lived in Bradenton, Florida, where he died in 2019 at the age of 87.

References

1932 births
2019 deaths
People from Timonium, Maryland
People from Mitchell, South Dakota
Sportspeople from Baltimore County, Maryland
Players of American football from South Dakota
American football defensive ends
South Dakota Coyotes football players
Baltimore Colts players
Western Conference Pro Bowl players
Presidents of the National Football League Players Association
Trade unionists from South Dakota
National Football League announcers
Baltimore Colts announcers
Deaths from dementia in Florida
Deaths from Alzheimer's disease